The University of Engineering and Technology, Lahore (UET Lahore) is a public university located in Lahore, Punjab, Pakistan specializing in science, technology, engineering and mathematics (STEM) subjects. It is the oldest and one of the most selective engineering institutions in Pakistan.

History and overview

Founded in 1921 in Mughalpura, a suburban area of Lahore, as Mughalpura Technical College, it later became the 'MacLagan Engineering College', a name given to it in 1923 after Sir Edward Douglas MacLagan, the then Governor of the Punjab, who laid the foundation stone of the main building, now called the Main Block. In 1932, it was affiliated with the University of the Punjab for the award of Bachelor's Degrees in Electrical and Mechanical Engineering. In 1939, the name was again changed to Punjab College of Engineering and Technology, and a Civil Engineering degree was also started in the college. At the time of partition, part of the college relocated to India, called East Punjab College of Engineering. In 1954, a bachelor's degree program in mining engineering was started. In 1962, it was granted charter and was named the West Pakistan University of Engineering and Technology, Lahore. During the 1960s, bachelor's degree programs were started in chemical engineering, petroleum and gas engineering, metallurgical engineering, architecture and city and regional planning. In 1972, it was officially renamed the University of Engineering and Technology, Lahore. By the 1970s, it had established over a score of master's degree programs in engineering, architecture, city and regional planning and allied disciplines. Several Ph.D. degree programs were also started. A second campus of the university was established in 1975 in Sahiwal which was relocated to Taxila in 1978 and became an independent university in 1993 called the University of Engineering and Technology, Taxila.

Today, it is widely considered one of the best and most prestigious engineering universities in Pakistan where more than 50,000 students apply for admission every year.

The university, as of 2016, had a faculty of 881 people of which 257 had doctorates. It has a total of 9,385 undergraduate and 1,708 postgraduate students studying. It has a strong collaboration with the University of South Carolina, University of Manchester and the Queen Mary University of London and has conducted research funded by Huawei, Cavium Networks, Microsoft and MontaVista. It is one of the highest ranked universities in Pakistan with domestic rankings placing it as the fifth best engineering school in Pakistan while QS World University Ranking put it as 324th in world in the category of Engineeing & Technology in the year 2022. It is also ranked 51-100 in the category of Petroleum Engineering, 251-300 in Electrical & Electronics Engineering, 301-350 in Mechanical Engineering, 351-400 in Chemical Engineering and 351-400  in Computer Science & Information Systems in the world by the same publication in 2022. Meanwhile, in Asia the university ranking is currently ranked at No. 183rd.

Location

The campus is situated on the Grand Trunk Road (GT Road), a few kilometers from the Mughal era Shalimar Gardens.

Sub campuses and constituent colleges

Faculties and departments

The university consists of following faculties and departments:

Faculty of Architecture and Planning
 Department of Architecture
 Department of City and Regional Planning
 Department of Product and Industrial Design

Faculty of Chemical, Metallurgical and Polymer engineering
 Department of Chemical Engineering
 Department of Metallurgical and Materials Engineering
 Department of Polymer and Process Engineering

Faculty of Civil Engineering
 Department of Civil Engineering
 Department of Transportation Engineering and Management
 Department of Architectural Engineering and Design
 Institute of Environmental Engineering and Research
 Centre of Excellence in Water Resources Engineering

Faculty of Earth Sciences and Engineering
 Department of Petroleum and Gas Engineering
 Department of Mining Engineering
 Department of Geological Engineering

Faculty of Electrical Engineering
 Department of Electrical Engineering
 Department of Computer Engineering
 Department of Computer Science

Faculty of Mechanical Engineering
 Department of Mechanical Engineering
 Department of Automotive Engineering
 Department of Industrial and Manufacturing Engineering
 Department of Mechatronics and Control Engineering

Faculty of Natural Sciences, Humanities and Islamic Studies
 Department of Humanities, Social Sciences and Modern Languages
 Department of Mathematics
 Department of Physics
 Department of Chemistry
 Department of Islamic Studies
 Institute of Business and Management (IBM)

Research centers

The university consists of the following research centers:

 Al-Khawarizmi Institute of Computer Science (KICS)
 Huawei – UET Joint TeleComm and IT Center
 Center for Language Engineering
 ZTE – UET Joint TeleComm Center
 Laser and Optronics Center
 Energy Research Technologies Development Center
 Institute of Environmental Engineering and Research
 DSP and Wireless Communication Center
 Center of Excellence in Water Resources Engineering
 Research Center
 Software Engineering Center
 Manufacturing Technologies Development Center
 Automotive Engineering Center
 Nano Technology Research Center
 Innovation and Technology Development Center
 Engineering Services UET Pakistan (Pvt) Limited (ESUPAK)
 Center for Energy Research and Development
 BioMedical Engineering Center

More than 870 students are foreign students and more than 1000 are female students.

Academics

Teaching faculty
The faculty consists of 741 people including 14 international faculty members; around 122 have doctoral degrees. Its faculty holds one Tamgha-e-Imtiaz, one Sitara-i-Imtiaz, one Izaz-e-Kamal Presidential Award and nine HEC Best Teacher Awards.

The university has established a Directorate of Research, Extension and Advisory Services which strives for the promotion and organization of research activities. The Al-Khwarizmi Institute of Computer Sciences is a notable name in research activity in computer sciences in Pakistan.

Co-curricular, extracurricular activities and student societies
The university has a sports complex, consisting of a swimming pool, tennis court, table tennis court, squash court and a cricket stadium that is also used for athletics. The university has several football grounds. Apart from sports-related facilities, there are societies to promote co-curricular activities and seminar. These include:

Islami Jamiat Talba UET Lahore
AIChE
Aks UET Photography Society
ASHRAE
ASME Student Section
Blood Donors Society (BDS)
CESA ACI Student Chapter
Environmental and Horticultural Society (EHS)
ICE Student Chapter UET Lahore
IEEE UET Student Branch
IET UET Lahore Section
Industrial and Manufacturing Engineers' Club
Literary Society
Mechatronics Club
SGE
Society of Mining Engineers (SOME)
Society of Product and Industrial Design (SPID)
Society of Petroleum Engineers (SPE), UET Lahore Student Chapter
UET Photography Club (UPC)
UET Science Society (SS)
SPACE Student Chapter
Society of Automotive Engineers
UET-ACM
UET Debating Society
UET Dramatics Society
UET Media Society (UMS)
UET Tribune

The National Library of Engineering Science

The National Library of Engineering Science, inaugurated by Faisal bin Abdul-Aziz Al Saud, is the central library of the university with a seating capacity for 400 readers and more than 125,000 volumes of books, 22,000 volumes of bound serials and 600 issues of scientific and technical serials on diverse fields. The Library has the honor of having recently been chosen by the Higher Education Commission to serve as the primary resource center for engineering and technical education. It is a three-story building in front of Allah Hu Chowk.

Notable alumni

 Fawad Rana, Owner of Lahore Qalandars
 Parvez Butt, Former Chairman of Pakistan Atomic Energy Commission (PAEC)
 Junaid Jamshed, Religious Scholar
 Jawad Ahmad, Pop Singer
 Junaid Khan, Rock Singer and Actor
 Najam Sheraz, Pop Singer
 Faakhir Mehmood, Pop Singer
 Sami Khan, Actor
 Ahsan Iqbal, Politician, Member of Pakistan Muslim League (N)
 Mir Nooruddin Mengal, slain Leader and Former Acting President of Balochistan National Party (Mengal)
 Fazal Ahmad Khalid, Former Vice Chancellor of the university
 Mehreen Faruqi, Australian Politician
 Peer Zulfiqar Ahmad Naqshbandi, Islamic Scholar
 Mosharraf Hossain, Bangladeshi Politician
 Arun Kumar Ahuja(Actor), Late Hindi film actor

Alumni in foreign university faculties
 Adil Najam, dean Pardee School of Global Studies at Boston University, former vice chancellor of Lahore University of Management Sciences and former associate professor at the International Institute for Sustainable Development, former associate professor at Tufts University, USA
 Ahsan Kareem, Robert M. Moran Professor of Engineering and Director of NatHaz Modeling Laboratory at the University of Notre Dame, USA
 Ishfaq Ahmad, fellow of IEEE, professor at The University of Texas at Arlington, USA
 Amir Asif, Professor of Electrical Engineering and Computer Science, and Vice President Research and Innovation, at York University, Toronto, Canada.

References

External links
 UET Lahore official website
 Industrial Open House and Career Fair, UET Lahore
 Institute of Business and Management UET Lahore
 Rachna College of Engineering and Technology Gujranwala
 UET Lahore Kala Shah Kaku campus
 UET Lahore Faisalabad campus
 UET Lahore Narowal campus
 Pakistan Engineering Council

 
Architecture schools in Pakistan
Engineering universities and colleges in Pakistan
Public universities and colleges in Punjab, Pakistan
1921 establishments in British India
Lahore
Universities and colleges in Lahore
Lahore District
Educational institutions established in 1921